Urnyak (Ürnäk) is a rural locality (a village) in Isheyevsky Selsoviet, Ishimbaysky District, Bashkortostan, Russia. The population was 119 as of 2010. There are 14 streets.

Geography 
Urnyak is located 31 km north of Ishimbay (the district's administrative centre) by road. Shikhany is the nearest rural locality.

References 

Rural localities in Ishimbaysky District